Ballintoy is a small village, townland (of 274 acres) and civil parish in County Antrim, Northern Ireland. It is in the historic barony of Cary. The village lies about one kilometre from Ballintoy Harbour, a small fishing harbour at the end of a very small, narrow, steep road down Knocksaughey hill which passes by the entrance to Larrybane and Carrick-a-Rede Rope Bridge. The harbour is host to a dawn service on Easter Sunday each year.

Amenities
Ballintoy's population was recorded at 165 people in the 2001 Census.

The village has commercial and social facilities including tourist accommodation, restaurants, several small shops, and two churches. The distinctive white Ballintoy Parish Church sits on the hill above the harbour. The village was originally built around a single street separating the inland pastures from the strip fields running towards the sea. Two of the village's oldest hotels and pubs, the Carrick-A-Rede Hotel and the Fullerton Arms, still stand on this street. The village is in the area covered by Causeway Coast and Glens Borough Council.

In 2011, some residents objected to the erection of bilingual street signs in English and Irish in a petition sent to Moyle District Council after an application was requested for an English/Irish sign at Harbour Road opposite the local Church of Ireland church.

Game of Thrones
The village was used for the fictional town of Lordsport in the Isle of Pyke during the second season of HBO's medieval fantasy television series Game of Thrones. Filming took place during August 2011.

Places of interest
 Bendhu House is a listed building on the road to the harbour and was built by the artist Newton Penprase.
 Dunseverick Castle lies in ruins near the village, and is a short drive from the Giant's Causeway. 
 Carrick-a-Rede Rope Bridge is just outside the village. The bridge links the mainland to the tiny Carrick Island. It is thought salmon fishermen have been erecting bridges to the island for over 300 years.
 Sheep Island, County Antrim is off the north coast.
 Ballintoy Parish Church was built in 1813 and incorporates the tower of the older church.

Civil parish of Ballintoy
The civil parish contains the following townlands:

Araboy
Artimacorkick
Ballinlea Lower
Ballinlea Upper
Ballintoy
Ballintoy Demesne 
Ballynastraid
Broughgammon
Carnlelis
Carrowcroey
Clegnagh
Cloghcorr
Coolmaghra
Craig
Craigalappan
Craiganee
Croaghbeg
Croaghmore
Curramoney
Currysheskin
Drumnagee
Drumnagessan
Glenstaghey
Island Macallan
Kilmahamogue
Knocknagarvan
Knocksoghey
Lagavara
Lemnagh Beg
Lemnagh More
Lisbellanagroagh Beg
Lisbellanagroagh More
Magheraboy
Magheracashel
Maghernahar
Prolusk
Templastragh
Toberkeagh
White Park

See also
List of towns and villages in Northern Ireland
List of civil parishes in County Antrim
List of townlands in County Antrim

References

External links

NI Neighbourhood Information Service
Moyle District Council

Villages in County Antrim
 
Townlands of County Antrim